Michaela Zrůstová (born 4 April 1987) is a Czech female basketball player. At the 2012 Summer Olympics, she competed for the Czech Republic women's national basketball team in the women's event. She is 6 ft 1 inches tall.

References

Czech women's basketball players
1987 births
Living people
Olympic basketball players of the Czech Republic
Basketball players at the 2012 Summer Olympics
People from Tábor
Sportspeople from the South Bohemian Region